Leuckart is a surname. Notable people with the surname include:

 Friedrich Sigismund Leuckart (1794–1843), German doctor and naturalist
 Rudolf Leuckart (1822–1898), German zoologist
 Rudolf Leuckart (1854–1889), German chemist, son of the Rudolf Leuckart above